Exocarpos gaudichaudii (also called Gaudichaud's exocarpus or hulumoa) is a species of plant in the Santalaceae family. It is endemic to Hawaii. It is threatened by habitat loss.

References

gaudichaudii
Endangered plants
Endemic flora of Hawaii
Taxonomy articles created by Polbot